The 7th General Junta was the meeting of the General Junta, the parliament of the Principality of Asturias, with the membership determined by the results of the regional election held on 27 May 2007. The congress met for the first time on 21 June 2007.

Election 
The 7th Asturian regional election was held on 27 May 2007. At the election the Spanish Socialist Workers' Party (PSOE) remained the largest party in the General Junta but fell short of a majority again.

History 
The new parliament met for the first time on 21 June 2007. María Jesús Álvarez (PSOE) was elected as the president of the General Junta, with the support of PSOE and IU-BA-LV.

Deaths, resignations and suspensions 
The 7th General Junta has seen the following deaths, resignations and suspensions:

 26 November 2008 - Manuel Aurelio Martín (IU/IX) and Noemí Martín (IU/IX) resigned after being appointed Minister of Rural Affairs and Fisheries and Minister of Social Welfare and Housing in the Asturian Government. Diana Camafeita (IU/IX) and Emilia Vázquez (IU/IX) replaced them respectively on 11 December 2008.
 22 December 2009 - Francisco Javier García (IU/IX) resigned due to political disagreements with his party. Roberto Colunga (BA) replaced him on 4 February 2010.
 13 July 2010 - Roberto Colunga (BA) left the United Left-Bloc of Asturias-The Greens group due to political disagreements with United Left, the biggest member of the coalition. He officially joined the Mixed group on 1 August 2010.
 3 January 2011 - Pelayo Roces (PP) resigned in order to support former deputy prime minister of Spain, Francisco Álvarez-Cascos, who left the party after he wasn't picked as nominee for President of Asturias ahead of the 2007 Asturian regional election. José Manuel Felgueres replaced him on 10 February 2011.
 31 January 2011 - Emilio Rodríguez (PP) resigned in order to join Asturias Forum (FAC), a split from the People's Party led by former deputy prime minister of Spain, Francisco Álvarez-Cascos. Pablo Álvarez (PP) replaced him on 17 February 2011.
 3 February 2011 - Cristina Coto (PP) resigned in order to join Asturias Forum (FAC). María Isabel Pérez (PP) replaced her on 24 February 2011.
 8 February 2011 - Marcial González (PP) resigned in order to join Asturias Forum (FAC). Rebeca Heli Álvarez (PP) replaced him on 10 March 2011.
 17 February 2011 - Luis Servando Peláez (PP) resigned in order to join Asturias Forum (FAC). Álvaro Álvarez (PP) replaced him on 10 March 2011.

Members

References

External links 

 Official website of the General Junta
 All members of the General Junta

General Junta of the Principality of Asturias
2007 establishments in Spain